Healthcare is universal in Portugal. The public service, the National Healthcare Service (Serviço Nacional de Saúde, or SNS), is accessible to all people, albeit with different billing conditions.

From November 3, 2019 many more people will be entitled to become SNS beneficiaries (basically, everyone who resides in Portugal, including people with irregular residence status; incarcerated people; holders of temporary stay visas...). It's not yet clear which procedures will be adopted, nor when, for services to implement the new law.

Universal access to healthcare 
The Constitution of the Portuguese Republic states, on its section 64, paragraph 3, item a), that "in order to ensure the right to health protection, it is primarily the responsibility of the State to ensure that all citizens, irrespective of their economic condition, have access to preventive, curative and rehabilitative care".

Portugal's Basic Health Law (Law 48/90) states on its Base II, paragraph 1, item b), that "it is a fundamental objective to achieve equality of citizens in access to health care, irrespective of their economic condition and wherever they live".

Law 93/2017 – that establishes the legal system for the prevention, prohibition and combating of discrimination on the basis of racial and ethnic origin, color, nationality, ancestry and territory of origin –  states that discriminatory actions include "the refusal or limitation of access to health care provided in public or private health facilities" (section 4, paragraph 2, item e)).

Access to public healthcare services cannot, thus, be denied, and especially not by clerks and administrative personnel – even to people who decline to pay expenses bills –, for they aren't neither trained nor mandated to perform triage.

Payments 
There are two types of payments: fees and expenses.

Fees (taxas moderadoras) are symbolic values charged to SNS beneficiaries (people with an SNS beneficiary number, or numero de utente) and to people who are entitled to being billed in the same conditions in certain situations (holders of documents that confer them such right – e.g., holders of a European Health Insurance Card (EHIC) access care for unforeseen situations or for chronic conditions as if they had an SNS number. For people without a SNS number there are, however, difficulties in accessing care at low cost in private providers that operate under an agreement with the SNS (e.g. clinical laboratories) or in buying subsidised medication at community pharmacies.

Expenses (despesas incorridas) are larger sums, or the "full price", charged to other people: tourists without an EHIC, people with a temporary stay visa to accompany a relative that's getting specialised care in Portugal, people who choose to use their private insurance...

Both the values for the expenses and the fees are determined by an ordinances (Portarias).

Some beneficiaries are exempt from paying fees due to personal circumstances: minors, pregnant people, firefighters, among others.

SNS public servants may and should try to collect pre-payment of expenses or symbolic fees (depending on which applies to a given person and/or situation), except when the person is not able to pay due to their clinical situation (e.g. when it's obvious the person needs urgent medical care), or due lack of means to pay (e.g., when the person informs that they don't have money and will pay later), and also when internal rules of the service determine that no charges shall be made (e.g., special consultations for screening and treatment of sexually transmitted infections).

Not being able (or willing) to pay up front cannot be used as motive to deny access to services.

Payments may be made at a later time and installment payment agreements are possible. Even without entering such an agreement people are allowed to make partial payments to mitigate their debt.

Not paying (or asking for correction of the expense bill) in due time may lead to charging of late payment interest. Between June 22, 2012 and December 31, 2016 not paying the fees in the 10 days after receiving the notification to do so was an administrative offense, punishable with a fine (and, if not paid, a forfeiture of wages). Since January 1, 2017 that no longer applies but default interest is charged.

From January 1, 2020 fees will no longer be charged in primary healthcare units (Centros de Saude), nor in other healthcare situations whenever the person is referenced to such care by SNS services.

People with irregular residency status 
People whom don't have a residency title (card) yet and have overstayed their time limit for legal permanence in Portugal may access some types of healthcare in the same billing conditions that apply to SNS beneficiaries.

Minors 
If the child was born in Portugal and, if at least one of the parents has Portuguese citizenship, or if at least one of the parents has been a holder of a valid residency title for at least two years, or if at least one of the parents was also born in Portugal and lives in the country (regardless of having a residency title or not when their child was born), the minor(s) are entitled to Portuguese nationality.

If the child was born in Portugal and, if at least one of the parents has been a holder of a valid residency title for less than two years, the minor is entitled to a residency title.

Minors with irregular status are entitled to access healthcare for free with a special document (that mus be renovated every two years) but some rules apply in order to get it.

Adults 
Despacho n.º 25360/2001 came to institute that, to all foreign citizens residing legally in Portugal, access be granted in equality of treatment given to beneficiaries of the SNS concerning health care and medication assistance provided by the institutions and services that comprise the SNS. In practice this led to issuance of beneficiary numbers ("número de utente") to holders of residence permits.

It also states that people in irregular situation of stay that have been residing for more than 90 days in Portugal (proved by means of a residence certificate issued by a Junta de Freguesia). Often Juntas de Freguesia issue certificates that don't declare the person has been living in the country for more than 90 days; when this happens health services still accept the document and check the arrival date stamped on the passport to check if more than 90 days have passed. Also often Juntas de Freguesia demand two witnesses (voters registered in that freguesia) to declare the veracity of the information; this is illegal but customary, and probably derives of ill interpretation of the change.

People with residency title 
Update coming soon.

Nationals of European Union Member-States, of Iceland, Liechtenstein, Norway, and Switzerland 
Update coming soon.

Holders of documents granting equal rights under bilateral agreements 
Update coming soon.

Other situations 
Update coming soon.

See also 
Healthcare in Portugal
Abortion in Portugal
Immigration to Portugal
Portuguese nationality law
Long-term resident (European Union)
Visa policy of the Schengen Area
Blue Card (European Union)
European Health Insurance Card

References 

Healthcare in Portugal
Immigration to Portugal